Guy Wilson may refer to:
 Sir Guy Wilson (public servant) (1851–1940), British public servant
 Guy Wilson (politician) (1877–1943), British soldier, company director, and politician
 Guy Wilson (cricketer) (1882–1917), English cricketer
 Guy Wilson (horticulturalist) (1885–1962), Irish horticulturalist
 Guy Wilson (rugby union) (fl.1929), English rugby union player
 Guy Wilson (historian) (born 1950), British military historian and former head of the Royal Armouries
 Guy Wilson (speedway rider) (fl.1991), Australian speedway rider
 Guy Wilson (actor) (born 1985), American actor

See also
 Richard Guy Wilson (born 1940), American architectural historian